The FIFA U-20 World Cup is the biennial football world championship tournament for FIFA members’ men's national teams with players under the age of 20. The competition has been staged every two years since the inaugural tournament in 1977 when it was hosted by Tunisia, under the tournament name of FIFA World Youth Championship until 2005. In 2007 the name was changed to its present form. The current title holder is Ukraine which won its first title at the 2019 tournament in Poland.

History 
In the twenty-two tournament editions staged, eleven different nations have won the title. Argentina U20 is the most successful team with six titles, followed by Brazil U20 with five titles. Portugal U20 and Serbia U20 have both won two titles (with the latter winning once as Yugoslavia U20), while Ghana U20, Germany U20, Spain U20, France U20, England U20, Ukraine U20 and Russia U20 (as the USSR U20) have won the title once each.

A corresponding event for women's teams, the FIFA U-20 Women's World Cup, began in 2002 with the name "FIFA U-19 Women's World Championship" and an age limit of 19. The age limit for the women's competition was changed to 20 beginning with the 2006 FIFA U-20 Women's World Championship, and the competition was renamed as a "World Cup" in 2007 in preparation for the 2008 event. The next edition will be held in 2023 in Indonesia, after the planned 2021 FIFA U-20 World Cup competition was cancelled due to the COVID-19 pandemic.

Qualification
24 national teams appear in the final tournament. 23 countries, including the defending champion, have to qualify in the youth championships of the six confederations.  The host country automatically qualifies.

Results

Teams reaching the top four

1 = includes results representing Yugoslavia
2 = includes results representing Soviet Union
3 = includes results representing West Germany

Performances by continental zones (as of 2019)

All continental confederations except for the OFC (Oceania) have made an appearance in the final match of the tournament. To date, CONMEBOL (South America) leads with eleven titles, followed by UEFA (Europe) with ten titles and CAF (Africa) with one title. Teams from the AFC (Asia) and CONCACAF (North America, Central America, Caribbean) have made the tournament final four times, but were defeated by strong UEFA sides. No current OFC member has ever made the semifinals; Australia reached the semifinals as an OFC member in 1991 and 1993, finishing fourth on both occasions, before the country joined the AFC in 2006.

1 = as Yugoslavia (1987).
2 = as part of OFC (currently in AFC since 2006).

Awards
The following awards are now presented:
 The Golden Ball is awarded to the most valuable player of the tournament;
 The Golden Boot is awarded to the top goalscorer of the tournament;
 The Golden Glove is awarded to the most valuable goalkeeper of the tournament;
 The FIFA Fair Play Trophy is presented to the team with the best disciplinary record in the tournament.

See also
List of association football competitions
FIFA U-17 World Cup
FIFA U-20 Women's World Cup
FIFA U-20 World Cup records and statistics
Toulon Tournament
Granatkin Memorial

References

External links

  
 Tournament archive at Fifa.com 
 World Youth Cup (U-20) Overview at the RSSSF 

 
Youth football competitions
Under-20 association football
World youth sports competitions
U-20 World Cup
Recurring sporting events established in 1977
U20